David McPherson is a Paralympic athletics and swimming competitor from Australia who competed in the 1980 Summer Paralympics and 1984 Summer Paralympics as a classified "2" athlete. At the 1984 Summer Paralympics he won two medals in athletics: a silver medal in the Men's 100 m 2 event and a bronze in the Men's 200 m 2 event.

References

Paralympic athletes of Australia
Athletes (track and field) at the 1984 Summer Paralympics
Paralympic silver medalists for Australia
Paralympic bronze medalists for Australia
Living people
Year of birth missing (living people)
Medalists at the 1984 Summer Paralympics
Paralympic medalists in athletics (track and field)
Australian male wheelchair racers